The Epsilon Euskadi ee1 is a racing car from the Spanish constructor Epsilon Euskadi.  It is designed and constructed for sports car racing in the Le Mans Prototype LMP1 class of the 24 Hours of Le Mans, and other similar endurance races.

2008
The Epsilon Euskadi ee1 made its racing début at the 2008 1000km of Catalunya. Epsilon Euskadi entered in just one car which was the #20 car driven by Ángel Burgueno and Miguel Ángel de Castro. In the race, it managed to finish but only in 32nd, third last in the finishers after only completing 167 laps at their home race. In the end, Epsilon Euskadi only picked up two points in the five round season coming from the 2008 1000km of Spa when they finished eleventh overall and seventh in their class completing 133 laps.

Le Mans
For the 2008 24 Hours of Le Mans, Epsilon Euskadi entered two cars for the race, the #20 car driven by Ángel Burgueno, Miguel Ángel de Castro and Adrián Vallés and the #21 car driven by Shinji Nakano, Stefan Johansson and Jean-Marc Gounon.  Qualifying went well, the #21 car qualified 15th with a best time of 3:32.939 and the #20 car qualified 17th with a best time of 3:34.281.  In the race, the all-black ee1 looked competitive but both cars had mechanical problems and had to retire. The #21 car was the first of the two to retire after completing 158 laps then the #20 car retired after completing 189 laps.

References

Racing cars
24 Hours of Le Mans race cars
Sports prototypes
Le Mans Prototypes